Kim Young-jun (김영준), also known as Kim Yeong-jun, Kim Yŏng-jun may refer to:

 Kim Young-jun (wrestler) (born 1948), South Korean wrestler
 Kim Young-jun (born 1963) or stage name Yoo Ha, South Korean film director
 Kim Young-jun (tennis) (born 1980), South Korean tennis player
 Kim Yong-jun (footballer) (born 1983), North Korean footballer
 Kim Young-jun (born 1988) or stage name Kim Si-hoo, South Korean actor
 Kim Yeong-jun (volleyball) (born 1940), South Korean volleyball player
 Kim Yeong-jun (field hockey) (born 1967), South Korean Olympic hockey player

See also
 Kim Yong-jun (disambiguation)